Bruno Giordano (born 7 June 1954 in Aosta) is an Italian politician.

He is a member of the regionalist party Valdostan Union and he served as Mayor of Aosta from May 2010 to May 2015.

See also
2010 Italian local elections
List of mayors of Aosta

References

External links
 

1954 births
Living people
Mayors of Aosta
Valdostan Union politicians